The 2001–02 UEFA Champions League was the 47th season of the UEFA Champions League, UEFA's premier club football tournament, and the 10th since its rebranding from the "European Champion Clubs' Cup" or "European Cup". The tournament was won by Real Madrid, who beat Bayer Leverkusen in the final to claim their ninth European Cup title. The final's winning goal was scored by Zinedine Zidane, with a left-footed volley from the edge of the penalty area into the top left corner.

Bayer Leverkusen eliminated all three English teams on their way to the final: Arsenal in the second group stage, followed by Liverpool in the quarter-finals and Manchester United in the semi-finals.

Manchester United striker Ruud van Nistelrooy was the tournament's top scorer, scoring 10 goals from the first group stage through to the semi-final.

Bayern Munich were the defending champions, but were eliminated by eventual winners Real Madrid in the quarter-finals.

Association team allocation
A total of 72 teams participated in the 2001–02 Champions League, from 48 of 51 UEFA associations. Liechtenstein (who don't have their own league) as well as lowest-ranked associations (Andorra and San Marino) were not admitted.

Below is the qualification scheme for the 2001–02 UEFA Champions League:
Associations 1–3 each have four teams qualify
Associations 4–6 each have three teams qualify
Associations 7–15 each have two teams qualify
Associations 16–49 each have one team qualify (except Liechtenstein)

Association ranking
Countries are allocated places according to their 2000 UEFA league coefficient, which takes into account their performance in European competitions from 1995–96 to 1999–2000.

Distribution
Since the title holders (Bayern Munich) qualified for the Champions League group stage through their domestic league, the group stage spot reserved for the title holders was vacated. The following changes to the default access list are made:
The champions of association 10 (Portugal) are promoted from the third qualifying round to the group stage.
The champions of association 16 (Austria) are promoted from the second qualifying round to the third qualifying round.
The champions of associations 27 and 28 (Cyprus and FR Yugoslavia) are promoted from the first qualifying round to the second qualifying round.

Participants
League positions of the previous season shown in parentheses (TH: Champions League title holders).

Round and draw dates
The schedule of the competition is as follows (all draws are held at UEFA headquarters in Nyon, Switzerland, unless stated otherwise).

Notes

Qualifying rounds

First qualifying round

|}

Second qualifying round

|}
* The second leg finished 4–0 to Maccabi Haifa but was awarded 0–3 against them for fielding a suspended player.

Third qualifying round

|}
* The annulled game 22 August 2001 Tirol Innsbruck - Lokomotiv Moscow 0–1 (Report UEFA) (MatchCentre UEFA). Appointed replay game 8 September 2001.

First group stage

16 winners from the third qualifying round, 10 champions from countries ranked 1–10, and six second-placed teams from countries ranked 1–6 were drawn into eight groups of four teams each. The top two teams in each group advance to the second group stage, and the third placed team in each group advance to the Third Round of the UEFA Cup.

Celtic, Lille, Liverpool, Lokomotiv Moscow, Mallorca, Roma and Schalke 04 made their debut in the group stage.

Group A

Group B

Group C

Group D

Group E

Group F

Group G

Group H

Second group stage 

Eight winners and eight runners-up from the first group stage were drawn into four groups of four teams each, each containing two group winners and two runners-up. Teams from the same country or from the same first round group could not be drawn together. The top two teams in each group advanced to the quarter-finals.

Group A

Group B

Group C

Group D

Knockout stage

Bracket

Quarter-finals
The first legs were played on 2 and 3 April, and the second legs were played on 9 and 10 April 2002.

|}

Semi-finals
The first legs were played on 23 and 24 April, and the second legs were played on 30 April and 1 May 2002.

|}

Final

The final was played on 15 May 2002 at Hampden Park in Glasgow, Scotland.

Statistics
The top scorers and assists from the 2001–02 UEFA Champions League (excluding qualifying rounds) are as follows:

Top goalscorers

Source: Top Scorers – Final – Wednesday 15 May 2002 (after match)

Top assists

Source: Top Assists – Final – Wednesday 15 May 2002 (after match)

See also
2001–02 UEFA Cup
2001 UEFA Intertoto Cup
2002 UEFA Super Cup
2002 Intercontinental Cup
2001–02 UEFA Women's Cup

References

External links

 2001–02 All matches – season at UEFA website
 European Cup results at Rec.Sport.Soccer Statistics Foundation
 All scorers 2001–02 UEFA Champions League  (excluding qualifying round) according to protocols UEFA + all scorers qualifying round
 2001/02 UEFA Champions League - results and line-ups (archive)
 Regulations of the UEFA Champions League 2001/2002

 
1
UEFA Champions League seasons